I Can Do All Things is the premiere recording from jazz artist, composer Jeremy Warren.  The album features prominent performers and composers such as Andy Milne, Lenny Pickett, Leon Marin, and Jack Cooper.

Background 
I Can Do All Things features Jeremy Warren's group The Rudiment and compositions written by Warren, Andy Milne, Jack Cooper and Dermel Warren (his wife).  The music captures mixes the jazz art form with the elements of contemporary popular music and is a personal journey of overcoming life's obstacles through music.

The album contains the many influences from Warren's musical upbringing and musical journey from Little Rock, to Memphis TN and eventually to New York City.  He was born and raised in North Little Rock and heavily exposed to music growing up.  His mother is an organist/pianist where she played at his grandfather's and now currently his father's church in Little Rock.  In 2003, he received a full scholarship to the University of Memphis Scheidt School of Music in Memphis, TN.  He earned dual bachelor's degrees in Jazz Studies and Music Education.  Warren notes his greatest and most influential musical growth happened in Memphis where he performed with numerous local/national artists as well as leading his own group every Saturday night on Beale Street for two years.
    
Warren moved to New York City in 2013 and received his master's degree in Music from New York University in May 2015. Key connections through that school and the city such as Andy Milne and Lenny Pickett are heard on the "I Can Do All Things" recording.

Track listing

Recording sessions
 March 22 and April 12, 2016, Flux Studios, New York, New York
 April 21 and 27, 2016, at NYU, New York, New York

Personnel

Musicians
 Drums: Jeremy Warren 
 Vocal: Dermel Warren
 Vocal: Gloria Ryan
 Vocal (male voice): Leon Marin 
 Trumpet: Gil Defay
 Alto saxophone: Rakiem Walker
 Alto saxophone: Ethan Helm
 Tenor saxophone: Lenny Pickett
 Piano/keyboards: Andy Milne
 Piano/keyboards: Joel Desroches  
 Organ: Sam Carroll  
 Bass: Parker McAllister
 Bass: Gabe Otero

Production
 Producer, composer: Jeremy Warren
 Producer: Dermel Warren
 Recording engineer: Josh Welshman
 Recording engineer: Tyler McDiarmid
 Mixing and Mastering: Eric Robinson, Zosermusic
 Liner Notes: Jeremy Warren
 Cover art and design: Smith-Lenior Graphic Creations
 Photography: Keeshan Defay

Promotion
Kari-on Productions headquartered in Atlanta, GA is the firm handling the promotion of "I Can Do All Things" record release.   The CD was submitted for the 2017 Grammy ballot in the categories R & B Album and Recording Package.

Music from the recording has been premiered and heard in numerous jazz and music venues in the New York/New Jersey region of the United States.

July 16, 2015 -- Papillion 25, South Orange, NJ

August 16, 2015 -- Harlem Nights Club, New York, NY

September 28, 2015—Whynot Jazz Room, New York, NY

November 7, 2015 -- Nabe Underground, Harlem, NY

December 13, 2015 -- Minton's Jazz Club, Harlem, NY

March 11, 2016 -- Club Bonafide, New York, NY

The album release (premiere) on June 1, 2016 was at Rockwood Music Hall in Manhattan, NY

Reception

I Can Do All Things charted for 13 weeks and peaked on the Roots Music Report airplay ratings; it peaked at #3.   On the CMJ New Music ratings for airplay it charted for 10 weeks and peaked at #6.  On the JazzWeek ratings it has charted for 19 weeks and peaking at #68 on August 22, 2016.

"Influences of Memphis blues can be detected throughout the recording combined with rations of R&B and soul making for an enjoyable jaunt."
Susan Frances, AXS

"...a clinic from Jeremy on how to create melodic drum lines and in giving space to other artists without diminishing your own mission. Jeremy knows how to kick off an album."
Travis Rogers, JazzTimes

"...(Jeremy) is a very talented and soulful drummer who has a beautiful feel and a great musical understanding."
Lenny Pickett (Saturday Night Live)

See also
Andy Milne
Lenny Pickett
Jack Cooper

Release history

References

External links
 
 
 
 
 Jeremy Warren web site
 Kari-On Productions record release page for I Can Do All Things
 

2016 albums
Jazz albums by American artists